Othorene is a genus of moths of the family Saturniidae. The genus was erected by Jean Baptiste Boisduval in 1872.

Species
The genus includes:
Othorene cadmus (Herrich-Schäffer, 1854)
Othorene hodeva (Druce, 1904)
Othorene purpurascens (Schaus, 1905)—Mexico
Othorene verana (Schaus, 1900)—from Mexico to Panama and Guatemala

References

 
Ceratocampinae